The Colonial Naval Defence Act 1865 (28 and 29 Vict., c. 14.) was an Act of the Parliament of the United Kingdom.

Background 
During the Invasion of the Waikato (July 1863 – April 1864) period of the New Zealand Wars the Imperial British forces realised they needed access to colonial ships to fight Māori. The Colonial government acquired vessels which were staffed by Royal Navy officers but owned by the colonial government. The vessels were under local and not Admiralty control. An armed ship, HMVS Victoria, owned by the Colony of Victoria transported troops to New Zealand for the campaign and took part in bombardments of Māori. The British government was concerned about its colonies developing their own navies, not under the control of the Royal Navy's Admiralty.

This led to the British parliament passing the Colonial Naval Defence Act 1865, which allowed the colonial governments to own ships, including for military purposes, but they would have to be under the Royal Navy's command.

Flags 

In 1866 the British Admiralty advised colonies that if they possessed vessels governed by the Act, they must fly the Royal Navy Blue Ensign but that they must also include on the flag the seal or badge of the colony.

New Zealand did not have a colonial badge, or indeed a coat of arms of its own at this stage, and so in 1867 the letters "NZ" were simply added to the blue ensign, following a decree by Governor George Grey on 15 January 1867.

See also 
 Historical flags of the British Empire and the overseas territories
 Blue Ensign

References

Bibliography

External links 
 Hansard mention of the Colonial Naval Defence Act 1865, in 1884

1865 in British law
United Kingdom Acts of Parliament 1865